Policja is the generic name for the national police force of the Republic of Poland. The Polish police force was known as policja throughout the Second Polish Republic (1918–1939), and in the modern Republic of Poland since 1990. Its current size is 100,000 officers and ca. 25,000 civilian employees. Among the branches in the force are: Criminal Service, Traffic Police Service, Prevention Service and Supporting Service. 

Many cities and some villages have their own city guards, named in urban areas Straż Miejska or in rural areas Straż Gminna, which supervise public order and road safety. However, city guards have jurisdiction only over misdemeanors and in cases of crimes may serve only in a supportive role for the state police.

Terminology

The force's name, Policja, translates into the English language as Police.

On the whole, officers' individual ranks are not used by the general public and thus when addressing an officer, it is common to hear the term  (female - ), Polish for mister/miss used to refer to police officers.

History

In 1919, with the re-independence of the Polish nation, the state reorganised itself along non-federalist lines and established a centralised form of government. Under the auspices of the new government and with assistance from a British mission of soldiers and police officers led by Brigadier-General Gordon Macready, a new national police force was formed; this 'Polish State Police' (Policja Państwowa) then existed as the primary law enforcement agency for the entire nation up until the outbreak of the Second World War in 1939. During the inter-war period, a number of key law enforcement duties were delegated to other formations, such as the Border Guard and Military Gendarmerie.

With the end of World War II and the onset of the communist period, the new Soviet backed government decided to radically change the structure of policing in Poland; the state 'Policja' was renamed as the 'Milicja Obywatelska' (Citizen's Militia), a name which was meant to reflect a change in the role of the police, from an instrument of oppression ensuring the position of the bourgeoisie, to a force composed of, and at the service of 'normal citizens'. Ironically the reality turned out to be largely the opposite and the Milicja instead represented a rather state-controlled force which was used to exert political repression on the citizens. The Milicja was, for the most part, detested by the general populace; events such as the police's conduct during the Gdańsk Shipyard Strike and surrounding the Popiełuszko affair, only worsened the people's view of their law enforcement agencies.

After the fall of the communist government in Poland, the system was reformed once again, this time reviving the pre-war name of 'Policja' and albeit with a few minor changes, the general system of law-enforcement of the Second Republic.

Transportation and equipment

Today, most common types include various models from Kia (Cee'd model - ca. 4000 in use) Škoda (mainly Octavia), Alfa Romeo, Ford Mondeo, Opel (mainly Opel Astra), Volkswagen, and Toyota, as of 2011 the FSO Polonez (manufactured in Poland) is no longer in use. The Polish police force has, since joining the European Union, been undergoing a thorough restructuring and has in the process acquired a large number of new vehicles; as of 2011 this process is still ongoing and new vehicles are constantly being procured in order to replace ageing old patrol cars as their service lives come to an end. In addition to standard sedan and hatchback model vehicles, the Policja has been investing significant amounts of money in developing their ability to respond to any incident no matter where it may be, this has in turn led to the purchase of a large number of all-terrain 4x4 vehicles and multi-purpose vans and trucks. This expansion in capabilities was a stated requirement of the police force's restructuring program.

Beginning in 2009, the painting scheme is being modified to a silver body design with blue reflective strip, similar to modern German police cars.

Traditionally, vehicles were painted a dark blue color with side doors painted in white, and with white stripes and the word "POLICJA" on both sides. Earlier versions (used at the beginning of the 1990s) had a thinner stripe with the word "POLICJA" written under it. This design was adopted from the paint scheme used by the communist milicja. Some formerly used vehicles even had visible traces of the word "POLICJA" being corrected from "MILICJA", with the first two letters in a different shade of white, on a patch of a different shade of blue.

All uniformed and most non-uniformed officers of the state police are routinely armed. In addition to their firearm, Policja officers carry handcuffs and a number of other pieces of equipment which usually includes a personal radio system for communication with other officers and their police station. Pepper spray is also commonly issued to officers in order to provide them with a non-lethal alternative weapon with which to incapacitate violent suspects.

Riot police, when needs be, are provided with non-ballistic body armour, helmets and shields. Less-lethal weaponry is also used by riot-control units such as shotguns with rubber bullets, tear gas canisters or water cannons. Sometimes they also deploy LRAD units. The strict control of civilian firearms ownership in Poland, only recently liberalized, has significantly aided the police in keeping gun crime to a minimum, and thus the incidence of police firearms use is low.

Firearms

Current patrol fleet 
The below list is not intended to be a full list of all the vehicles used by the Polish Police, instead it lists the most commonly used vehicles.

Patrol cars 

As of 1 January 2018;
Kia (Cee’d, Venga) - 5 732 vehicles
Opel (Astra, Vectra, Corsa, Insignia, Mokka) – 2 785 
Škoda (Octavia, Fabia, Superb, Rapid) – 968
Hyundai (i30, i20, Elantra) – 589

Aircraft 

The Policja currently has a total of 13 helicopters at its disposal, these are based in:

Kraków - 1 x PZL W-3 Sokół
Szczecin - 1 x PZL W-3 Sokół
Warsaw - 2 x Mil Mi-8, 2 x Bell 407, 1 x Bell 412, 3 x Sikorsky UH-60 Black Hawk S-70i variant.
Łódź - 1 x Bell 206
Poznań - 1 x Bell 407 
Wrocław - 1 x Bell 206

In addition to the airborne and land-based patrol units of the Policja, many regional commands, and especially those based near the coast or through which major waterways flow, have maritime units. The largest of police maritime units are currently found on the Vistula river in Warsaw (under the command of the Capital Police) and the Warmian-Masurian Voivodeship where there is a large network of lakes and rivers. In coastal areas, maritime law enforcement cooperation also exists between the Policja and the Polish Border Guard.

Polish Police aircraft fleet list on official website

General commander of the Policja

The Policja's general commander is the senior-most officer of the Polish police. The rank of the general commander (usually General Inspector) is considered to be equivalent to that of a ranking general in the Polish military and both general inspektors and chief inspectors (who are also considered Police 'Generals') are entitled to wear embroidered white eagles, the state symbol, on their uniform lapels.

The commander’s apparatus is the National Police Headquarters based in Warsaw's Puławska Street. It is from here that the day-to-day administration and organisation of the Polish police's activities is coordinated. The hedquarters is considered to have jurisdictional supremacy over all its other units, and subordinate commanders are responsible to the general commander in their capacity as his regional 'executives'.

The position has existed in a number of guises throughout the existence of the Polish police, and whilst the current office came into being following Poland's transformation into a liberal democracy in 1990, the same rank was also used for the highest-ranking officer of the State Police of the Second Republic during the inter-war years. Nowadays, holders of this office are considered to be successors to the commanders of the inter-war state police; commanding officers of the communist-era Milicja Obywatelska (Citizens' Militia) however, are not considered successors of the original cadre of Policja generals as they exercised authority over an organisation often utilised by the state as an instrument of political oppression.

Since 1990 there have been twelve general commanders of the Policja who have completed their service. General Inspector Marek Papała, the formet holder of the office, was assassinated by a person or persons unknown on 25 June 1998. He was shot in the head with a silenced weapon whilst exiting his car near his home in Warsaw's southern Mokotów district. The commander's murder remains unsolved and is considered to be one of the most significant outstanding cases under active investigation by the Polish police.

Rank structure

Officers

Other

Structure and branches of the Policja
The Policja is currently divided into a number of different services. Each voivodeship/municipal command has subdivisions within its force. This leaves the police service with a large number of specialised branches which can more specifically target certain types of crime and apply more expert knowledge in the investigation of cases relating to their area of policing. In addition to these specific groups, all police forces retain a majority of officers for the purpose of patrol duty and general law enforcement. 

Typically a constituent force of the Policja will contain the following subdivisions within its structure:
Criminal Police - investigation and prevention of serious and violent crime
The criminal police may include specialised teams such as anti-drugs and financial crime prevention units
All forces have crime scene and forensics units
Preventative Police - general law enforcement operations and patrol duty (includes riot police divisions)
Counter-terrorism Police - special and high risk operations
Traffic Police - road safety, traffic marshalling and highway patrol/pursuit
Logistical Support Police - provision of logistical support and technical skills
Police Aviation Service - aviation support (not present in every force)
Investigative Police - investigation of complex cases and process of referral to the state prosecutor's office
Judicial Police - protection of court and state prosecutor's office premises, judges, prosecutors, victims and suspects, execution of court orders
Maritime Police - maritime patrol and pursuit

Anti-terrorism units (BOA/SPKP) 

The Policja has highly qualified and well-equipped counter-terrorism formations. On a regional level, voivodeship commands have control of smaller units called SPAP (Samodzielny Pododdział Kontrterrorystyczny Policji), Independent Counter-terrorism Policja Subunit), these units are responsible for, high-risk arrests, search warrant execution service, hostage rescue operations (only in alarm situations; BOA has priority in this task) and other similar tasks.

Because of their training and skill level, members of the BOA and SPKP units cooperate with similar special police formations from the Czech Republic, Slovakia, Germany and other ATLAS members. They also, train with servicemen from Biuro Ochrony Rządu, Straż Graniczna, Agencja Bezpieczeństwa Wewnętrznego, Wojska Specjalne, and most recently with the U.S. Army and 10th CAB's premier special missions company, A/3-10 GSAB WarAngels.

Peacekeeping and international cooperation
Since the Policja's foundation in its current form in 1990, the service has taken part and continues to participate in a number of international peacekeeping and international police missions around the world. To date the Policja has sent officers to participate in the following international peacekeeping missions:
United Nations Mission in Liberia (UNMIL) - 3 officers
European Union Police Mission in Bosnia and Herzegovina (EUPM) - initially 12 officers (2003), later reduced to 3 senior advisers (2009)
European Union Police Mission in Afghanistan (EUPOL Afghanistan) - 3 officers and 2 senior advisers
European Union Monitoring Mission in Georgia (EUMM) - 10 officers (working alongside 16 officers of the Żandarmeria Wojskowa)
European Union Rule of Law Mission in Kosovo (EULEX) - 8 senior advisers
In addition to participating in international missions, the Policja also send delegates to and cooperate with international law enforcement agencies and organisations such as Europol and Interpol. Currently the Polish officers make up the eighth largest staff contingent of Europol; a figure which is expected to rise as the Polish police force becomes more integrated with, and more active within, the organisation. Europol has also become far more important to Poland's policing community in recent years since Poland, in 2007, became a signatory of the Schengen Agreement, allowing for greater European integration, uninterrupted travel, and cross-border police cooperation. To this end, Polish cooperation with the German, Czech, Slovakian and Lithuanian police services has reached an all-time high. Furthermore, the Policja officers have taken part in a number of foreign police officer training and exchange programs, such as Project Lifesaver, which has seen a number of officers sent to the UK to observe and discuss alternative methods of policing abroad.

As a constituent member of Interpol, the Polish police is expected to adhere to the terms of International arrest warrants and cooperate with the police forces of other nations through formal diplomatic channels. In many cases such cooperation has led to the arrest of high-risk criminals.

Organisation
The Polish Police is a centralised police force, organised under one central command in Warsaw and with all officers assigned to one of 17 voivodeship/municipal operations' commands, except in the case that they are specialists working independently for the national commandant.

Regional headquarters

Police training establishments

The Policja has five training establishments sited within Poland. Four of these training establishments are police schools for enlisted personnel, whilst the fifth is a higher educational institution tasked with the education of officers and senior officials in a range of disciplines and expertises. The four junior colleges are located in:
Piła, Greater Poland Voivodeship - Piła Police School
Słupsk, Pomeranian Voivodeship - Słupsk Police School
Katowice, Silesian Voivodeship - Katowice Police School
Legionowo, Masovian Voivodeship - Police Training Centre
This school was founded in 1954 as the officer academy of the Milicja Obywatelska, renamed in 1972 to the Higher Militia School, the college finally became the Higher Police School upon Poland's return to liberal democracy in 1990. Since then it has remained the only establishment in the country certified to run courses for commissioned officers of the Polish police, and the officer's commissioning course. All students who attend the Higher Police School are expected to study criminal, constitutional and economic law. In addition to academic studies, officer candidates are trained in modern policing techniques, weapons' handling, and informatics. The college has numerous links with senior police academies in Europe and throughout the wider world.

Ceremonial units

Representative Honor Guard Company of the Policja

The Representative Honor Guard Company is the ceremonial drill unit of the police. Affiliated with the Representative Honor Guard Regiment of the Polish Armed Forces, it performs public duties and drill and ceremony on behalf of the police force and the President of Poland. In regards to national events, it mainly performs during the annual National Independence Day ceremony in November alongside other honor units on Piłsudski Square.

Representative Band of the Policja

The Policja's representative band was first founded in 1968. Its core was composed of a group of several musicians, which gradually expanded. From the beginning, the band improved rapidly, reaching a high artistic level, as reflected in the discretion of the judges at musical contests nationwide. In the years 1984, 1986, 1988, the band won its most prestigious trophy, the Cup of the Minister of Internal Affairs. From the outset, the musicians performed at various national, departmental, religious and state events. The band's musicians have on numerous occasions represented the Polish police outside the country, including concerts in Denmark, Belgium, Czech Republic, Belarus and Russia, yet they still value their well-kept tradition of playing performances for the ordinary residents of Warsaw. The band's musical repertoire includes marches, concert pieces, transcriptions of orchestral music and religious songs, as well as a great deal of other developmental music. Being the official representative band of the Policja, the group's musicians are often invited to play parade music for important events on national holidays such as the 3rd May Constitution Day.

Criticism of the Policja
Overall the level of trust in the Policja and its work has increased steadily over the years since 2001. In 2001 only 46% of respondents to a national survey carried out on behalf of the police categorised their work and achievements as 'good', however, by the end of 2009 this figure had grown significantly, and despite small undulations, an average of 72% rated the Policja's work as 'good' or better. This brings the level of trust in the police to around the same level of 64-75% seen in other member states of the European Union.

Much in the same way as other national police forces, the Policja is sometimes criticised for the methods it employs in maintaining law and order, such criticism is typically voiced by Polish youth. This is most commonly expressed with the acronyms (C)HWDP and JP.

Gallery

See also
 Milicja Obywatelska (MO) - communist era police/militia service
 Ministry of Internal Affairs and Administration of the Republic of Poland (Ministerstwo Spraw Wewnętrznych i Administracji)
 Służba Bezpieczeństwa (SB) - communist era secret police service

References

Further reading
Andrzej Kremplewski, The Police and Non-Governmental Organizations in Poland, in András Kádár (ed.), Police in Transition: Essays on the Police Forces in Transition Countries, Central European University Press, 2001,

External links

 Official Website

Law of Poland
 
1919 establishments in Poland